Calico Creek is a rural locality in the Gympie Region, Queensland, Australia. In the  Calico Creek had a population of 156 people.

Geography
Mary Valley Road (State Route 51) forms the north-eastern boundary. Calico Creek, a tributary of the Mary River, rises in the south of the locality and flows through to the north. Almost all of the southern boundary is the northern extent of Amamoor National Park.

History 
Calico Creek State School opened on 8 July 1936 and closed on 31 August 1970. The school was located on the corner of Calico Creek Road and Robinson Road (approx ).

In the  Calico Creek had a population of 156 people.

References 

Gympie Region
Localities in Queensland